Oluyemi Kayode (7 July 1968 – 1 October 1994) was a Nigerian sprinter.

Kayode won the silver medal in 4 x 100 m relay at the 1992 Olympic Games in Barcelona, Spain, together with teammates Chidi Imoh, Olapade Adeniken and Davidson Ezinwa.  He also won a silver medal in 200 metres at the 1993 African Championships and was Nigerian national champion on that distance in 1993 and 1994 respectively. He finished sixth in the 200 metres at the 1994 Commonwealth Games. Kayode died in a car accident in Northern Arizona in October 1994.
A stadium in Ado-Ekiti is named in his honor.

References

External links
Oluyemi Kayode at databaseOlympics
Oluyemi Kayode at the Commonwealth Games Federation

1968 births
1994 deaths
Yoruba sportspeople
Nigerian male sprinters
Athletes (track and field) at the 1992 Summer Olympics
Athletes (track and field) at the 1994 Commonwealth Games
Commonwealth Games competitors for Nigeria
Olympic athletes of Nigeria
Olympic silver medalists for Nigeria
Road incident deaths in Arizona
Medalists at the 1992 Summer Olympics
Olympic silver medalists in athletics (track and field)
20th-century Nigerian people